Nový Jičín is a town in the Moravian-Silesian Region of the Czech Republic. It has about 23,000 inhabitants. The historic centre of Nový Jičín is well preserved and is protected by law as an urban monument reservation.

Nový Jičín is known for the hatting industry and is nicknamed the "town of hats".

Administrative parts

Villages of Bludovice, Kojetín, Loučka, Straník and Žilina are administrative parts of Nový Jičín.

Etymology
There are two theories as to how the name "Jičín" came about. According to local legends, it could be derived from the brave daughter of a local castle owner named Jitka (Jitčín, later amended to Jičín). Another theory derives the name from the Slavic word for wild boar div (Dičín, later amended to Jičín).

The attribute Nový ("new") was added to distinguish it from Starý Jičín ("Old Jičín").

Geography
It lies in the Moravian-Silesian Foothills. The town is situated on the small river of Jičínka, at its confluence with the streams Zrzávka, Grasmanka and Rakovec.

History

The first written mention of Nový Jičín is from 1313, however it was probably founded around 1280. It was established as the economic centre of the Starý Jičín estate. It was a property of Lords of Kravaře and later of the Zierotin family.

Žerotínský Castle was originally part of the town fortifications, the construction of which began in the 1380s and continued in the early 16th century. During the rule of Bedřich of Zierotin (1533–1541), the castle was rebuilt into a Renaissance residence.

In 1620, Frederick V promoted Nový Jičín to a royal town. The town was decimated by Thirty Years' War and by large fires in 1768 and 1773.

In the 19th century, the Jewish population returned to the town and large textile factories were established. The hatter industry has flourished and Nový Jičín is still today called the "town of hats". During the industrialization in the mid-19th century, two town gates and most turrets and attic of the castle were demolished. Only two defense towers were left in memory.

Until 1918, the town was part of the Austrian monarchy (Austria side after the compromise of 1867), head of the district with the same name, one of the 34 Bezirkshauptmannschaften in Moravia. The German population was expelled in 1945.

Demographics

Economy
Nový Jičín is known for the hatting industry. Hats have been made here since 1630. The mechanical production began here in 1865 and is the oldest hat factory in the world. The modern TONAK company was established in 1945 and is still one of the three largest headwear manufacturers in the world.

The largest employer with headquarters in the town is Hanon Systems Autopal, a manufacturer of refrigeration and air conditioning components for the automotive industry.

Transport
Nový Jičín lies on the European route E462. There is the Nový Jičín–Suchdol nad Odrou railway line of local importance.

The largest airport in the region, Leoš Janáček Airport Ostrava is about 15 kilometres from Nový Jičín.

Sights

The historic core of Nový Jičín is a Renaissance-Baroque town with a pure example of medieval urbanism of the second half of the 13th century. In its centre is a square with arcades and a rectangular system of adjacent streets. In the 16th century, the arcades were built and the wooden houses were replaced by stone ones.

The town square is lined by preserved Renaissance and Baroque burger houses. The town hall was a Renaissance house from the 16th century, rebuilt to the town hall in 1661. In 1881, the façade was rebuilt and modified in the pseudo-Gothic style. In 1929–1930, an insensitive pseudo-Renaissance reconstruction was made.

The most valuable house is Stará pošta (i.e. "old post office"), a two-storey Renaissance house from 1563. In a historic house where general Ernst Gideon von Laudon died in 1790 is the tourist information centre and an exposition of the hat-making tradition of Nový Jičín.

The Church of the Assumption of the Virgin Mary is the landmark of the historic centre. The original Gothic castle was replaced by the current building by the Jesuits in 1732–1740.

The oldest stone building in Nový Jičín is the Žerotínský Castle from the 1380s. Today it houses the regional museum. Only a bastion from 1613 and few fragments of the town walls are preserved to this day.

Notable people

Ernst Gideon von Laudon (1717–1790), German-Austrian generalisimo; died here
Eduard Veith (1858–1925), Austrian painter
Adolf Herz (1862–1947), Austrian-Swiss engineer and inventor
Hugo Baar (1873–1912), Moravian-German landscape painter
Božena Benešová (1873–1936), writer
Alfred Neubauer (1891–1980), racing manager
Fred Liewehr (1909–1993), Austrian actor
Max Mannheimer (1920–2016), writer, survivor of the Holocaust
Vladimír Válek (born 1935), conductor
Harun Farocki (1944–2014), German filmmaker and author
František Černík (born 1953), ice hockey player
Stanislav Moša (born 1956), theatre and musical director
Karel Stromšík (born 1958), footballer
Vlasta Redl (born 1959), folk musician
Kateřina Konečná (born 1981), politician
Rostislav Klesla (born 1982), ice hockey player
Tomáš Sklenák (born 1982), handball player
Lenka Masná (born 1985), athlete
Karolína Huvarová (born 1986), fitness trainer and model
Petra Klosová (born 1986), swimmer

Twin towns – sister cities

Nový Jičín is twinned with:
 Épinal, France
 Görlitz, Germany
 Kremnica, Slovakia
 Ludwigsburg, Germany
 Novellara, Italy
 Świętochłowice, Poland

References

External links

Sightseeing in the town

Populated places in Nový Jičín District
Cities and towns in the Czech Republic
Margraviate of Moravia